Brigitte Ingrid van der Burg (born 7 April 1961 in Tanga, Tanzania) is a Dutch politician. As a member of the People's Party for Freedom and Democracy (Volkspartij voor Vrijheid en Democratie) she was an MP between 30 November 2006 and 23 March 2017. She focused on matters of the Dutch Royal House, local government finance, youth policy, organization of the Dutch government, consultancy and Kingdom relations.

Van der Burg studied human geography with a specialization in developing countries at Utrecht University.

References

External links 
  Brigitte van der Burg  personal website
  House of Representatives biography
  People's Party for Freedom and Democracy biography

1961 births
Living people
Dutch corporate directors
Dutch geographers
Members of the House of Representatives (Netherlands)
People from Tanga Region
People's Party for Freedom and Democracy politicians
Social geographers
Utrecht University alumni
21st-century Dutch politicians
21st-century Dutch women politicians